Marco d'Aviano, born Carlo Domenico Cristofori (November 17, 1631 – August 13, 1699) was an Italian Capuchin friar. In 2003, he was beatified by Pope John Paul II.

Life 
Carlo Domenico Cristofori was born in Aviano, a small community in the Republic of Venice (Italy). Educated at the Jesuit College in Gorizia, at 16 he tried to reach the island of Crete, where the Venetians were at war with the Ottoman Turks, in order to preach the Gospel and convert the Muslims to Christianity. On his way, he sought asylum  at a Capuchin convent in Capodistria, where he was welcomed by the Superior, who knew his family, and who, after providing him with food and rest, advised him to return home.

Inspired by his encounter with the Capuchins, he felt that God was calling on him to enter their Order. In 1648, he began his novitiate. A year later, he professed his vows and took his father's name, Marco, becoming Fra' Marco d'Aviano. On 18 September 1655 he was ordained a priest in Chioggia. His ministry entered a new phase in 1664, when he received a licence to preach throughout the Republic of Venice and other Italian states, particularly during Advent and Lent. He was also given more responsibility when he was elected Superior of the convents of Belluno in 1672, and Oderzo in 1674.

His life took an unexpected turn in 1676, when he gave his blessing to a nun, bedridden for some 13 years: she was miraculously healed. The news spread far and wide, and it was not long before the sick, and many others from all social strata, began to seek him out.

Among those who sought his help was Leopold I, Holy Roman Emperor, whose wife had been unable to conceive a male heir. From 1680 to the end of his life, Marco d'Aviano became a close confidant and adviser to him, providing the irresolute and often indecisive emperor with guidance and advice for all problems, political, economic, military or spiritual. His forceful, energetic and sometimes passionate and fiery personality proved a good complement for Leopold's Hamlet-like tendency to allow endless doubts and scruples to paralyse his capacity for action. As the danger of war with the Ottoman Turks grew near, Marco d'Aviano was appointed by Pope Innocent XI as his personal envoy to the Emperor. An impassioned preacher and a skillful mediator, Marco d'Aviano played a crucial role in resolving disputes, restoring unity, and energizing the armies of the Holy League, which included Austria, Poland, Venice, and the Papal States under the leadership of the Polish king Jan III Sobieski. In the decisive Battle of Vienna (1683), the Holy League succeeded in inflicting a defeat on the invading Ottoman Turks. This marked the end of the last Turkish attempt to expand their power in Europe, and the beginning of the long European counter-offensive that was to continue ultimately until the disintegration of the Ottoman Empire in 1918. This may therefore be considered one of the decisive battles of history. It also put an end to the period of Ottoman revival under the Koprulu Grand Vizirs and their protégé and successor, Kara Mustapha, who was in command of the Ottoman army at Vienna.

From 1683 to 1689 Marco participated in the military campaigns, playing a crucial role in promoting good relations within the Imperial army and encouraging the soldiers. He was present at the liberation of Buda in 1686 and at the siege of Belgrade in 1688. He always maintained a strictly religious spirit, to which any violence and cruelty were repugnant. As a result, at the siege of Belgrade several hundred Muslim soldiers successfully appealed to him personally, in order to avoid being massacred upon capture.

In the judgement of historians, Marco's influence over Leopold was exercised responsibly, in the sole interests of Christianity and of the House of Austria. In one of his private letters to the Emperor, Marco actually scolds him quite forcefully for granting a benefit to one of his brothers, reminding him that, by so doing, he was only providing ammunition for the enemies of their cause.

Marco d' Aviano died of cancer on August 13, 1699 in Vienna. He is buried in the Kapuzinerkirche, in whose vault  the Habsburg emperors are buried.

Honorary protection
Notable people who are baptised under protection of Marcus are:
 Archduke  Anton Karl Ludwig Georg Felix Marcus d'Aviano of Habsburg Lothringen.
 Archduchess Adelheid Maria Josefa Sixta Antonia Roberta Ottonia Zita Charlotte Luise Immaculata Pia Theresia Beatrix Franciska Isabelle Henriette Maximiliana Genoveva Ignatia Marcus d'Aviano of Austria.
 Archduke  Felix Friedrich August Maria vom Siege Franz Joseph Peter Karl Anton Robert Otto Pius Michael Benedikt Sebastian Ignatius Marcus d'Aviano, Erzherzog von Österreich)
 archduke Karl Ludwig Maria Franz Joseph Michael Gabriel Antonius Robert Stephan Pius Gregor Ignatius Markus d'Aviano of Habsburg-Lothringen
 Archduke Carl Christian Maria Anna Rudolph Anton Marcus d'Aviano of Austria.
 Archduke Imre Emanuel Simeon Jean Carl Marcus d'Aviano of Austria
 Archduke Christoph Henri Alexander Maria Marcus d'Aviano of Austria 
 Archduke Alexander Hector Marie Karl Leopold Marcus d'Aviano of Austria
 Archduke Rudolf Syringus Peter Karl Franz Joseph Robert Otto Antonius Maria Pius Benedikt Ignatius Laurentius Justiniani Marcus d'Aviano von Habsburg-Lothringen.
 Archduke Joannes Carlos Luis Clemente María José de Aviano Leopoldo de Habsburgo-Lorena (1962-1975) 
 Archduchess Elisabeth Charlotte Alfonsa Christina Theresia Antonia Josefa Roberta Ottonia Francisca Isabelle Pia Marcus d'Aviano van Oostenrijk 
 Archduke Lorenz Otto Carl Amadeus Thadeus Maria Pius Andreas Marcus d'Aviano
 Archduke Amedeo Maria Joseph Carl Pierre Philippe Paola Marcus d'Aviano of Austria.
 Archduke Joachim Carl Maria Nikolaus Isabelle Marcus d'Aviano of Austria.
 Grand duke Jean Benoît Guillaume Robert Antoine Louis Marie Adolphe Marc d'Aviano of Luxembourg.
 Prince Constantin Jean Philippe Marie Albert Marc d'Aviano of Nassau.
 Prince Wenceslas François Baudoin Léopold Juraj Marie Marc d'Aviano of Nassau
 Prince Jean André Guillaume Marie Gabriel Marc d'Aviano of Nassau.
 Prince Joachim Maria Nikolaus Isabelle Marcus d'Aviano of Belgium.
 Prince Carl-Johan Félix Julien Marc d'Aviano of Nassau

Media
In the 2012 Polish and Italian historical drama film The Day of the Siege: September Eleven 1683 about the Battle of Vienna, Marco d'Aviano is portrayed by F. Murray Abraham [IMDb].

Trivia
A popular myth concerning d'Aviano says that he invented the Cappuccino after the Battle of Vienna. No mention of this occurs in any of d'Aviano's biographies or in any contemporary historical sources. Indeed, the story does not appear until the late 1980s, which indicates that it was possibly made up as a joke.

References

External links
marco-d-aviano.cabanova.de

1631 births
1699 deaths
People from the Province of Pordenone
Italian beatified people
Capuchins
17th-century venerated Christians
Beatifications by Pope John Paul II
Venerated Catholics by Pope John Paul II
House of Habsburg